Hell night or hellnight may refer to:
Hell Night, a 1981 horror film by Tom DeSimone
Hellnight, a Japanese horror video game by Atlus Co

See also
Hazing, a ritualistic test used as a means of initiation into a social group
Devil's Night, October 30, a night of vandalism and other mischief in some parts of the United States
Hell Knights, creatures from the Doom video game series